Adrian King is a former First Deputy Attorney General of the State of Pennsylvania. Prior to his election, King had been the deputy chief of staff to Governor Ed Rendell
and a former Director of the Pennsylvania Emergency Management Agency. 
He was appointed in January 2005. He resigned in September 2005.

References

Living people
State cabinet secretaries of Pennsylvania
Year of birth missing (living people)